The Nommo Award is a literary award presented by The African Speculative Fiction Society. The award is named after the Nommo. The awards recognize works of speculative fiction by Africans, defined as "science fiction, fantasy, stories of magic and traditional belief, alternative histories, horror and strange stuff that might not fit in anywhere else." The Nommo Awards have four categories for best Novel, Novella, Short Story, and Graphic Novel.

Winners and short list nominees

Novel
The Novel Award is also known as The Ilube Nommo Award for Best Speculative Fiction Novel by an African.

Novella

Short Story

Graphic Novel

The African Speculative Fiction Society 

The African Speculative Fiction Society (ASFS) promotes science fiction and fantasy by Africans. Its 58 charter members include writers, editors, artists and publishers.

Members nominate and vote on the Nommo Awards for African Speculative Fiction.“The ASFS will provide a place where writers, readers, and scholars can come together to find information, connect with each other, and act as watchdogs for their collective interests.” Chinelo Onwualu, co-founder of Omenana

Established August 15, 2016 with 58 charter members, the ASFS and its Nommo Awards is a body for African science fiction/fantasy professionals.

The 2016 charter members 
The 58 charter members of 2016.

 A. Igoni Barrett
 Afolabi Muheez Ashiru
 Amatesiro Dore
 Andrew C. Dakalira
 Ayodele Arigbabu
 Biram Mboob
 Catherine Shepherd
 Cat Corona Hellisen
 Chad Rossouw
 Mazi Chigozie Nwonwu
 Chikodili Emelumadu
 Chinelo Onwaulu
 Clifton Cachuaga
 Dave de Burgh
 Dayo Ntwari
 Denise Kavuma
 Diane Awerbuck
 Dilman Dila
 Ekari Mbvundula
 Ellah Wakatama Allfrey
 Ezeiyoke Chukwunonso
 IfeOluwa Nihinlola
 Ivor Hartmann
 Jason Mykl Snyman
 Jekwu Ozoemene
 Joan de la Haye
 Joe Machina
 John Barigye
 Hannah Onoguwe
 Kiprop Kumutai
 Lauren Beukes
 Mame Diene
 Awards Subcommittee
 Mandisi Nkomo
 Masimba Musodza
 Margaret Hegottir
 Mehul Gohil
 Mia Aderne
 Moses Kilolo
 Muthi Nhlema
 Nerine Dorman
 Nick Wood
 Nikhil Singh
 Ntone Edjabe
 Oshoke Irene
 Pemi Aguda
 Rafee Aliyu
 Richard Oduor Oduku
 Samuel Kolawole
 Shadreck Chikoti
 Sofia Samatar
 Sophie B Alal
 Stephen Embleton
 Suyi Davies
 Tade Thompson
 Terh Agbedeh
 Tiseki Tich Chilima
 Wole Talabi

Logo design 

The Nommo Awards logo and ASFS logos were designed in 2016 by Stephen Embleton. The logo is an image of the Nommo in Dogon cosmology, twins who on land can take the form of fish walking on their tails."The Nommo are mythological ancestral spirits (sometimes referred to as deities) worshipped by the Dogon people of Mali. The word Nommos is derived from a Dogon word meaning "to make one drink." The Nommos are usually described as amphibious, hermaphroditic, fish-like creatures. Folk art depictions of the Nommos show creatures with humanoid upper torsos, legs/feet, and a fish-like lower torso and tail. The Nommos are also referred to as “Masters of the Water”, “the Monitors”, and "the Teachers”. Nommo can be a proper name of an individual, or can refer to the group of spirits as a whole. For purposes of this article “Nommo” refers to a specific individual and “Nommos” is used to reference the group of beings."

References

Science fiction awards
African literature
Fantasy awards
Africanfuturism
Speculative fiction awards
African literary awards
Awards established in 2016
Novella awards
Short story awards
Comics awards